Pushkarne (Ukrainian: Пушкарне) is a railway station located a few hundred meters from the village of Hrabovske (formerly Pushkarne) in Sumy Oblast, Ukraine. The station is on the Sumy Directorate of Southern Railways on the Basy-Pushkarne and Pushkarne-Ilyok-Penkovka lines.

Pushkarne station is located in between Krasnopillya and Ilyok-Penkovka stations slightly west of the border with Russia.

On the Ukrainian side is a dead end for diesel trains going over the Sumy - Pushkarne route. The station is also responsible for carrying out border control for travel into Russia on the Pushkarne-Ilyok-Penkovka line.

Passenger service

As of early 2019, only suburban trains stop at Pushkarne station.

Notes

 Tariff Guide No. 4. Book 1 (as of 05/15/2021) (Russian) Archived 05/15/2021.
 Arkhangelsky A.S., Arkhangelsky V.A. in two books. - M.: Transport, 1981. (rus.)

References

External Links

Pushkarne on railwayz.info
Suburban train schedule

Railway stations in Sumy Oblast
Sumy
Buildings and structures in Sumy Oblast
Railway stations opened in 1921